Egnatia Street is the main commercial street in downtown Thessaloniki. The road is named for the Roman-era Via Egnatia which passed near the city.  Lined with shops and office buildings, it is one of the busiest streets of Thessaloniki.

Gallery

Thessaloniki
Streets in Thessaloniki